Zereshgeh (also Romanized as Zereshgāh and Zarishkah) is a village in Hemmatabad Rural District, in the Central District of Borujerd County, Lorestan Province, Iran. At the 2006 census, its population was 1,185, in 279 families.

References 

Towns and villages in Borujerd County